The Binnaway–Werris Creek railway line is a railway line in the northern part of New South Wales, Australia and forms part of a cross country route between Werris Creek on the Main North Line and Dubbo in the Central West of New South Wales.

Gap 

The line has been rearranged at the Gap to connect to the Northwest Railway line and could therefore be called the Binnaway–Gap railway line.  The original section of line between the Gap and Werris Creek, with its junction that points the "wrong" way, has been closed, except for a portion used as a siding for loading coal.

Stations 

Stations on this line include:

 Binnaway
 Ulinda
 Neible
 Oakey Creek
 Connemarra
 Bomera
 Remep
 Premer
 Yannergee
 Tamarand
 Colly Blue
 Spring Ridge
 Caroona
 Nardu (abandoned)
 Bakana (abandoned crossing loop)
 Gap
 Werris Creek

See also 
 Rail transport in New South Wales

References 

Regional railway lines in New South Wales
Standard gauge railways in Australia
Liverpool Plains Shire